"Mzeo" is a song by Georgian singer Mariam Mamadashvili.  It represented Georgia and was the winning song at the Junior Eurovision Song Contest 2016 in Valletta, Malta. Mamadashvili also performed Mzeo in the opening of the 2017 edition of the contest.

Music video
The music video was released on 24 October 2016. It features Mamadashvili performing the song in a studio setting.

References

External links

Junior Eurovision Song Contest winning songs
2016 singles
2016 songs